Kriz may refer to :

Places and jurisdictions
 an oasis in Tunisia, the site of the Ancient city ad modern titular see of Tigias (now  Henchir-Taus), which was in the Roman province of Africa Bizacena
 Qrız, village in Azerbaija

Persons
 Alois Kříž (1911–1947), Czechoslovak journalist and Nazi collaborator who was executed
 Jürgen Kriz, German psychologist
 Kříž, Czech surname

See also
 Križ (disambiguation)